Mazraat Deir al-Ashayer is a Syrian village in the Qudsaya District of the Rif Dimashq Governorate. According to the Syria Central Bureau of Statistics (CBS), Mazraat Deir al-Ashayer had a population of 1,107 in the 2004 census.

Maps show the village located in Lebanon, as there is no formal border demarcation between the two countries.

References

External links

Populated places in Qudsaya District